York Lodge may refer to:

 York Lodge (Cazenovia, New York)
York Lodge No. 563, Columbus, Ohio